National Freeway 1, also known as Sun Yat-sen Freeway, is a freeway in Taiwan, the first freeway built in Taiwan.

Naming
The Republic of China government named the freeway Sun Yat-sen Freeway in honor of Sun Yat-sen, the country's founding father.

National Freeway 1 is a tollway where the amount charged varies by distance traveled, with vehicles being fitted with an electronic tag to facilitate toll calculation; the term "freeway" refers to "free of signal", and not free from charge.

History
The construction began in 1971. The north section between Keelung and Zhongli (now Zhongli District, Taoyuan) was completed in 1974, and the entire highway was opened in 1978. A  viaduct on top of the freeway between Xizhi and Wugu was completed in 1997 in order to expand the capacity of the road.

Saudi Arabia supported the construction of the highway by providing an interest free loan.

Lanes
The lanes in both directions are listed below.
 4 Lanes:
 Keelung terminus – Exit 23 (Yuanshan)
 Xizhi-Wugu Elevated Highway: Xizhi terminus – Exit 26 (Huanbei)
 6 Lanes:
 Exit 23 (Yuanshan) – Exit 25 (Taipei)
 Exit 52 (Airport System) – Exit 192 (Changhua System)
 Exit 198 (Changhua) – Exit 356 (Nanzih) (special measures adopted in partial sections)
 Exit 367 (Kaohsiung) – Kaohsiung terminus
 Xizhi-Wugu Elevated Highway: Exit 26 (Huanbei) – Wugu terminus
 8 Lanes:
 Exit 25 (Taipei) – Exit 52 (Airport System)
 Exit 192 (Changhua System) – Exit 198 (Changhua)
 Exit 356 (Nanzih) – Exit 362 (Dingjin System)
 10 Lanes:
 Exit 362 (Dingjin System) – Exit 367 (Kaohsiung)

Exit list

Xizhi–Wugu Elevated Road

Wugu–Yangmei Elevated Road

Gallery

See also
 Highway system in Taiwan
 Ten Major Construction Projects

References

 Taiwan Area National Freeway Bureau 
 Taiwan Area National Freeway Bureau 

Transport infrastructure completed in 1978
Highways in Taiwan